The Women's team pursuit competition at the 2017 World Championships was held on 12 and 13 April 2017.

Results

Qualifying
The fastest eight teams qualified for the first round, from which the top four remained in contention for the gold medal final and the other four for the bronze medal final.

 Q = qualified; in contention for gold medal final
 q = qualified; in contention for bronze medal final

First round
First round heats were held as follows:
Heat 1: 6th v 7th fastest
Heat 2: 5th v 8th fastest
Heat 3: 2nd v 3rd fastest
Heat 4: 1st v 4th fastest

The winners of heats 3 and 4 proceeded to the gold medal final.
The remaining 6 teams were ranked on time, from which the top 2 proceeded to the bronze medal final.

 QG = qualified for gold medal final
 QB = qualified for bronze medal final

Finals
The final classification was determined in the medal finals.

References

Women's team pursuit
UCI Track Cycling World Championships – Women's team pursuit